Yaolu is a town located in the middle east of Chaling County, Hunan, China. The town was formed by merging 9 villages of the former Lushui Town, 24 villages and a community of the former Yaopi Town (腰陂镇) On November 20, 2015.

References

External links

Divisions of Chaling County